Tomáš Paprstka (born 1 March 1992) is a Czech professional cyclo-cross cyclist.

Major results

Cyclo-cross

2009–10
 1st  UCI World Junior Championships
 3rd National Junior Championships
2012–13
 Toi Toi Cup
1st Louny
 1st Cyclo-cross Stadl-Paura
2013–14
 Toi Toi Cup
1st Milovice
1st Kolín
2014–15
 3rd Overall Toi Toi Cup
2015–16
 1st Overall Toi Toi Cup
1st Hlinsko
1st Milovice
1st Holé Vrchy
 1st Cyclocross International Podbrezová
2016–17
 1st Overall Toi Toi Cup
1st Mladá Boleslav
1st Holé Vrchy
 2nd National Championships
2017–18
 1st Overall Toi Toi Cup
1st Jabkenice
1st Hlinsko
1st Holé Vrchy
 1st Cyclocross Rakova
 1st Cyclocross International Podbrezová
2018–19
 1st Grand Prix Trnava

Mountain bike
2010
 3rd Mixed relay, World Mountain Bike Championships
 3rd Mixed relay, European Mountain Bike Championships
2012
 1st  National Under-23 Cross-country Championships

References

External links
 

1992 births
Living people
People from Vsetín
Czech male cyclists
Cyclo-cross cyclists
Cross-country mountain bikers
Sportspeople from the Zlín Region